Shenaneh-ye Do (also Romanized as Shenāneh-e Do; also known as Shenāneh) is a village in Hoveyzeh Rural District, in the Central District of Hoveyzeh County, Khuzestan Province, Iran. At the 2006 census, its population was 26, in 6 families.

References 

Populated places in Hoveyzeh County